Melicoccus bijugatus is a fruit-bearing tree in the soapberry family Sapindaceae, native or naturalized across the New World tropics including South and Central America, and parts of the Caribbean. Its stone-bearing fruits are edible. It is also called Bajan ackee, genip, guinep, genipe, ginepa,  kenèp, quenepa, quenepe, quenette, chenet, skinup, talpa jocote, mamón, limoncillo, canepa, skinip, kenepa, kinnip, huaya, or mamoncillo.

Taxonomy

The genus Melicoccus was first described by Patrick Browne, an Irish physician and botanist, in 1756. This description was based on M. bijugatus trees which were cultivated in Puerto Rico. In 1760, Nikolaus Joseph von Jacquin described the first species in Browne's genus, which he named M. bijugatus. In 1762 Linnaeus used a spelling variation of the name Melicocca bijuga. Over the next two centuries, Linnaeus' spelling variation was used in almost all publications. A proposal was made in 1994 to conserve Melicocca over Melicoccus, but the proposal was rejected, leading to a restoration of the original version of the name.

In 1888 German taxonomist Ludwig Radlkofer placed Melicoccus in the tribe Melicocceae together with eight other genera. In his monograph on the Neotropical members of the tribe (Talisia and Melicoccus) Pedro Acevedo-Rodríguez suggested that although Talisia and Melicoccus appeared to form a monophyletic group, the other (Old World) genera probably did not belong to the same lineage.

The specific epithet bijugatus refers to the bijugate leaves, leaves which consist of two pairs of leaflets.

Distribution

Melicoccus bijugatus is native to northern South America and naturalised in coastal and dry forest in Central America, the Caribbean and parts of the Old World tropics. It is believed to have been introduced into the Caribbean in pre-Columbian times and is also found in India.  This fruit, known as quenepa in Puerto Rico, grows particularly abundantly in the municipality of Ponce, and there is a yearly celebration in that municipality known as Festival Nacional de la Quenepa (National Genip Fruit Festival). The fruit ripens during the warm summer months.

Description
They are typically dioecious plants, however autogamous trees occur from time to time. 
Their pulp is orange, salmon or yellowish in color with a somewhat juicy and pasty texture.

Fruit

The bulk of the fruit is made up of the one (or, rarely, two) whitish seeds, which are surrounded by an edible, orange, juicy, gelatinous pulp. There are efforts in Puerto Rico and Florida to produce cultivars with a more favourable flesh-to-seed ratio.

When ripe, the fruits have a bittersweet, wine-like flavour and have mild laxative properties. They are extremely rich in iron and phosphorus. The seed, being slippery, is a potential choking hazard.

Fruits mature in the dry season or summer.

Use
The main use of the mamoncillo is its sweet fruits, which are consumed fresh or canned, and can also be used in the preparation of soft drinks and alcoholic beverages. It can produce a strong yellow dye, although it is rarely used for this purpose. 

The pit is also edible. When roasted, it resembles cashew nuts. The indigenous peoples of the Orinoco river consume them as a substitute for cassava, and in Nicaragua, they are ground and made into horchata as a cure for parasites. 

The wood of the tree is pale, dense and moderately heavy with a fine grain, and is used for construction, carpentry, and fine cabinetmaking. However, it is not particularly durable, so its use is limited to indoors. 

The leaves are used in various traditional medicinal preparations, and also used as pest deterrents. 

The species is also commonly planted along roadsides as an ornamental tree.

Quenepa in popular culture 
The quenepa fruit is frequently referenced in popular culture in the Spanish Caribbean, including songs such as Suave by Puerto Rico rapper René Pérez (Residente).

See also
 Korlan
 Longan
 Lychee
 Rambutan

References

External links
 Fruits of Warm Climates: Mamoncillo

Sapindaceae
Tropical fruit
Edible nuts and seeds
Flora of Colombia
Flora of northern South America
Taxa named by Nikolaus Joseph von Jacquin
Dioecious plants